is a Japanese politician of the Liberal Democratic Party, a member of the House of Representatives in the Diet (national legislature). A native of Kitaakita District, Akita and graduate of Chuo University, he was elected to the House of Representatives for the first time in 2005.

See also 
Koizumi Children

References 
 

1949 births
Living people
Politicians from Akita Prefecture
Chuo University alumni
Koizumi Children
Members of the House of Representatives (Japan)
Liberal Democratic Party (Japan) politicians